Stigmatopora argus, the spotted pipefish, is a species of ray-finned fish from the family of pipefish and seahorses (Syngnathidae). The scientific name of the species is the first validly published in 1840 by Richardson.

It is endemic to Australia, is usually green with obvious black spots on its dorsal surface and can grow to a length of 27 centimetres.

Stigmaptopora argus has a prehensile tail that it uses to clasp seagrass or macroalgae. It feeds on small crustaceans, including copepods and mysids.

References

External links
Stigmatopora argus (Richardson, 1840) Spotted pipefish
Fishes of Australia : Stigmatopora argus

spotted pipefish
Marine fish of Southern Australia
spotted pipefish
Taxa named by John Richardson (naturalist)